The 2012–13 season was Aston Villa's 138th professional season; their 102nd season in the top flight; and their 25th consecutive season in the Premier League. The club was managed by Paul Lambert, their third manager in three seasons, after Alex McLeish was sacked on 14 May 2012, having himself only been in charge for 11 months. Lambert's first competitive match came on the opening day of the Premier League season on 18 August 2012, a 1–0 defeat to newly-promoted West Ham United at Upton Park. His first Premier League win came on 15 September 2012, a 2–0 victory against Swansea City at Villa Park. He was handed a one-match touchline ban on 21 November 2012 for comments relating to a penalty decision in Villa's defeat to Manchester City. On his first return to Carrow Road, Lambert received a mixed reception from the Norwich fans on 11 December 2012 in a League Cup quarter-final which his Villa team won 4–1.

On 23 December 2012, Villa were defeated 8–0 against Chelsea at Stamford Bridge, the club's heaviest ever defeat in top-flight football. This was followed by consecutive home defeats, with Villa losing 4–0 to Tottenham Hotspur and 3–0 to Wigan Athletic, leading to increased pressure on Lambert's position. On 22 January 2013, Villa played Bradford City in the second leg of the League Cup semi-final at Villa Park, having lost the first round tie 3–1 at Valley Parade. The final score on the night was a 2–1 win for Villa, leaving an aggregate score of 4–3 to Bradford. Lambert kept his job despite the poor run as the team flirted with the relegation places continuously over the next few months. Lambert did however manage to get Villa to record back-to-back wins for the first time since May 2011, as they defeated fellow relegation rivals Reading and Queens Park Rangers. He then oversaw the club's biggest victory since 2008, as Villa thrashed Sunderland 6–1. 

Villa finished 15th with the youngest starting eleven in the Premier League, leading to praise from pundit Alan Hansen, who said that Lambert was "a contender for "Manager of the Season." Highlights of the season included Lambert's summer acquisition of star striker Christian Benteke, the introduction of Villa's Player of the Season, goalkeeper Brad Guzan, reaching the semi-finals of the League Cup and securing Villa's place in the Premier League for the 2013–14 season. An under-21 Aston Villa team competed in the new Professional Development League 1 that replaced the Premier Reserve League. The under-19 Aston Villa team once again took part in the NextGen Series, after competing in the inaugural season and reaching the quarter finals. The team went all the way to win the competition to become only the second team to be crowned NextGen champions.

Review

Pre-season

The club began making plans for pre-season as early as 12 March 2012, when the free transfer of Australian Brett Holman was announced, with the player officially joining on 1 July after his deal with former club AZ expired. Later that month, the club announced a pre-season tour of the United States that would see them travelling to Chicago, Philadelphia and Portland. Following the conclusion of the previous season, Alex McLeish was sacked as manager on 14 May 2012 as a direct result – after Villa finished 16th in the league. Managerless Villa then released a number of players on 23 May 2012 after their contracts had expired. First team players released included Carlos Cuéllar, Emile Heskey and Brad Guzan, as well as a host of academy players. Villa hired Paul Lambert as their new manager on 2 June 2012, after the manager had impressed during his three-year spell at Norwich City. The move was endorsed by players and fans alike who, after the disappointing previous season, saw this as a major positive step for the club. Lambert set about making the job his, by appointing his two trusted allies: Ian Culverhouse, who became the new Villa Assistant Manager, and Gary Karsa, who was given a new role of "head of football operations" from old club Norwich as they were deemed surplus to requirements by Lambert's replacement, Chris Hughton. Long-time staff member Kevin MacDonald, who had been with the club since 1995 in a number of roles, most recently as reserve team manager but former caretaker manager in 2010, left the club on 9 June 2012. On his departure, MacDonald stated, "I've had an incredible 17 years at Aston Villa, one of the biggest clubs in the country, and wish to thank all the staff and players I have worked with during my time at the club. I wish Aston Villa every success in the future."

Lambert made his first signing a month into his reign (2 July) at Villa, when he signed Moroccan midfielder Karim El Ahmadi from Feyenoord for an undisclosed fee, reported to be £2 million. El Ahmadi stated before his arrival that joining the club, and playing in the Premier League, would be a "dream come true" and that he was looking forward to "dictating games" for Villa. Four days later (6 July), Lambert made his second summer signing when young defender Matthew Lowton joined for an undisclosed fee, reported to be £3 million from Sheffield United Following his move to Villa, Lowton stated that he hoped to emulate former Sheffield United player Phil Jagielka in reaching the England squad. The new manager announced on 16 July that the club would be re-signing Brad Guzan on a three-year deal, after he was previously released in May. Lambert later stated that he had re-signed Guzan so that he could challenge Shay Given for the number one spot, and Guzan backed this up by declaring he had not returned to sit on the bench. 1 August 2012 saw two transfers at the club – one in, one out – as James Collins returned to his former club West Ham United for £2.5 million, to pave the way for Villa to recruit central defender Ron Vlaar from Feyenoord – the second player of the summer to join Villa from the Rotterdam club (after El Ahmadi) and the third from the Eredivisie (after El Ahmadi and Holman). The club again announced the transfer as an undisclosed fee but the media reported the deal to be worth about £3 million. Vlaar immediately declared his ambition to become a Villa great and aimed to become a club legend in central defence, just as Paul McGrath and Martin Laursen had done so previously. It was announced that Darren Bent would become Villa's new club captain whilst Stiliyan Petrov was absent, recovering from acute leukaemia.

Villa's schedule saw them kick off their pre-season at Burton Albion on 14 July, with the Villans winning 2–1 thanks to an own goal and a debut goal for Brett Holman. The Villa squad then made their way to the US for their tour with matches against Philadelphia Union, Chicago Fire and Portland Timbers. The first two games resulted in 1–0 victories for Villa, with Nathan Delfouneso and Gabriel Agbonlahor getting the goals against Philadelphia and Chicago respectively.

The final game turned out to be a dramatic 2–2 draw with the Villa goals scored by defenders Ciaran Clark and new boy Matthew Lowton, who chalked up his first goal for the Claret and Blues. Ironically, both Villa goals came from set pieces, a feat Villa failed to achieve in the entirety of the last season. The Timbers equalised twice with goals from Sebastián Rincón and Rodney Wallace, which sent the game into a penalty shootout (a tradition for pre-season games in the U.S.). Villa eventually ran out winners after a tense 5–4 shootout win. The squad returned to England after staying undefeated in their tour and played their next friendly six days later against Peterborough United. The club continued their unbeaten pre-season record by recording a 2–0 win, courtesy of goals from youngster Daniel Johnson and a second goal for the club for Brett Holman. Lambert and his new look Villa side eventually suffered defeat in the next match, a 1–3 defeat by Nottingham Forest. Barry Bannan's free kick, which levelled the scores at 1–1, was not enough for the Villa after two goals from Lewis McGugan and a killer third from Marcus Tudgay sealed victory for the Championship side. The last fixture in their pre-season schedule saw Villa travel to Germany for a friendly against four-time Bundesliga champions Werder Bremen. The match was the final chance for Lambert to test out his new squad and hopefully decide his starting line up for the opening fixture against West Ham a week later. An exhilarating match that brought six goals in a 3–3 draw saw Villa lose the lead twice after initially being 1–0 down and Darren Bent grabbing a brace. Ciaran Clark scored his second goal of pre-season with Niclas Füllkrug, Eljero Elia and Aaron Hunt getting the goals for Bremen. Lambert said after that the brace for Bent would fill him with confidence ahead of the upcoming season.

August

Month summary
The Premier League fixture list was announced on 18 June 2012 and it gave Villa an away tie against newly promoted West Ham United to open the new season. There were no meetings between the two clubs last season as West Ham were consigned to the Championship, but ironically this was the opening fixture for Villa in the 2010–11 season which resulted in a 0–3 victory in Villa's favour, in which James Milner scored his last goal in his final appearance for the Villans before his move to Manchester City. The League Cup second round draw also took place in August with Villa being handed a home tie versus League One side Tranmere Rovers to be played on 28 August. Villa's first league game of the new season ended in defeat as they went down 0–1 to West Ham, courtesy of a Kevin Nolan strike, at Upton Park. On 24 August, the club were dealt a massive blow when promising young midfielder Gary Gardner was ruled out for the entire season with an anterior cruciate ligament (ACL) injury in his right knee. This was his second ACL injury after previously injuring his left knee, in December 2009. The same day, Jean Makoun completed a long-awaited loan move to French Ligue 1 club Rennes. After experiencing supposed work permit issues making him unable to take any part as a player of Aston Villa, Paul Lambert admitted he had never even met the player and that he was not part of his plans. A day later, Villa lost their second league game of the season 1–3 to Everton. Goals from Steven Pienaar, Marouane Fellaini and Nikica Jelavić gave the Toffees a 0–3 half-time lead, before Ciaran Clark was sent off for Villa after fouling Jelavić, who at the time was the last man. Karim El Ahmadi scored from 30 yards, his first for Villa, but ultimately it was just a consolation. Villa and Lambert's first win of the new season came in the League Cup against Tranmere Rovers. Goals from Fabian Delph, Chris Herd and a first competitive goal since February 2012 for Darren Bent sealed a 3–0 victory for the Villans. The following day, Villa signed England under-21 left back Joe Bennett from Middlesbrough on a four-year deal, for a fee rumoured to be between £2.5 and 4 million. Upon his arrival, Bennett stated, "I am really excited to have joined a massive club in Aston Villa and I'm eager to fight for a starting place and get in the team." On 30 August, Villa drew Manchester City in the third round of the League Cup. The match took place on 25 September at the Etihad Stadium.

A busy summer transfer deadline day 2012, saw Villa sign three new players: midfielder Ashley Westwood signed from Crewe Alexandra on a four-year deal, and strikers Christian Benteke from K.R.C Genk and Jordan Bowery from Chesterfield. Bowery signed a three-year deal and cost the club a rumored £500,000 with the fee rising to £1 million with add ons. Benteke signed a four-year deal for a fee believed to be £7 million, making him the most expensive transfer of the window for Villa . Earlier in the day, a £7 million bid was also accepted by Fulham for American forward Clint Dempsey, but the player ultimately rejected the deal as he favoured a move to Liverpool. The move to Liverpool later fell through and the player eventually joined Tottenham Hotspur. One player also departed the club, as Nathan Delfouneso joined Blackpool on a season-long loan.

August league table

August game stats

September

Month summary
Villa earned their first point of the season in the next game, after drawing 1–1 with Newcastle United at the Sports Direct Arena. Ciaran Clark's first half goal was cancelled out by a wonder strike from Hatem Ben Arfa and Villa's performance was reported to be much improved after the Everton game. The draw also lifted Villa off the bottom of the table and out of the relegation zone, at this early stage. The club's first league win of the season and first in 13 league matches came two weeks later, after the international break, as they beat Swansea City 2–0 at Villa Park – a reverse score of the fixture last season. A first competitive goal for the club for Matthew Lowton, a swerving volley, and a goal on his debut for substitute Christian Benteke wrapped up the points for Villa. Ron Vlaar was named captain for the match, replacing Darren Bent, who had captained the side in the previous matches. On 21 September, Stephen Warnock joined Bolton Wanderers on a three-month loan. The left back had not made a competitive appearance beforehand after falling out of favour with the new manager. The following day (22 September), Villa suffered a shock defeat at the hands of newly promoted and bottom of the table Southampton, going down 1–4 at St Mary's. Villa took the lead through Darren Bent's first league goal of the season in the first half. However, goals from Nathaniel Clyne, a Ciaran Clark own goal and a brace, including a penalty, for Rickie Lambert saw the South Coast club emphatically earn their first points of the season. Ron Vlaar was again named Villa captain, leading it to be believed that he had replaced Darren Bent as team captain. Villa didn't let this result affect their next performance however, as they recorded a shock 2–4 victory against champions Manchester City in the League Cup on 25 September. Villa twice came back after being behind, first being 1–0 down and then 2–1 down. Mario Balotelli gave City a half time lead but a Gareth Barry own goal against his former club put Villa level. Aleksandar Kolarov scored a trademark free kick, before Gabriel Agbonlahor scored his first goal of the season to send the tie into extra time. Charles N'Zogbia netted Villa's third after Agbonlahor's shot was parried by Costel Pantilimon before Agbonlahor grabbed his second and Villa's fourth, courtesy of a deflection, sending them through to the next round. Villa's reward for defeating City was a potentially tricky away tie to League One side Swindon Town, managed by former West Ham striker Paolo Di Canio, to be played on 30 October. Villa's final game of the month was a highly anticipated West Midlands derby against early high flyers West Bromwich Albion, which ended 1–1. Each team wanted to show the other that they were the top team in the West Midlands, and Villa went about setting the Baggies straight with a dominant first half performance. However, it was West Brom who took the lead early in the second half, as James Morrison beat an attempted offside trap and crossed a low ball towards Shane Long, before Villa captain Ron Vlaar's attempted clearance hit Long's foot and rolled past Brad Guzan. Villa equalised through substitute Darren Bent in the 80th minute, after he coolly put in the rebound following a goal mouth scramble from a corner. The draw saw Villa register their worst ever start to a Premier League season, with only five points from six games.

September league table

September game stats

October

Month summary
The team began the month with a trip to north London to play Tottenham Hotspur at White Hart Lane. The match finished 2–0 to Spurs, with goals from Steven Caulker and Aaron Lennon condemning Villa to their fourth loss and continued their poor start to the season. After a two-week international break, Villa returned to league action on 20 October against Fulham at Craven Cottage. Villa continued their worst start to a season in 26 years by losing their fifth game, as a late Chris Baird goal gave Fulham a 1–0 win. This loss left Villa one place and one point above the relegation zone. On 23 October, promising youngster Daniel Johnson joined League One outfit Yeovil Town on a month's loan. The next match saw Lambert face his old club Norwich City for the first time since leaving them to join Villa in the summer. The match ended 1–1 after Christian Benteke gave Villa the lead, but Norwich replied through Michael Turner, ten minutes from time. Joe Bennett was sent off for Villa after receiving two yellow cards, with Villa leading 1–0. This result meant that Villa did not win a league match in October and had still won only one so far this season. However, Villa continued to excel in the League Cup as they knocked out Swindon Town, to advance. The match finished 3–2 to Villa but it took a 90th-minute winner from Christian Benteke to see Villa book their place in the quarter-finals. Villa had led 2–0, after goals from Benteke and Gabriel Agbonlahor, and looked to be easing to a win before Swindon managed to level the score with two quickfire goals from 18-year-old substitute Miles Storey. However, Benteke's late winner sent Villa through and made sure of their only win in October. The draw for the quarter-finals was made the following day, with Villa getting an away tie at Paul Lambert's former club Norwich to be played on 11 December.

October league table

October game stats

November

Month summary
The month started with a victory for Villa as they ran out 1–0 winners against Sunderland, managed by former manager Martin O'Neill, at the Stadium of Light. Gabriel Agbonlahor scored the only goal of the game, his first in the league for 12 months, as Villa recorded their first away win since January. Villa hosted Manchester United in the next game, and roared into an unexpected 2–0 lead thanks to two goals from Andreas Weimann, his first goals of the season. However, two goals from substitute Javier Hernández and an own goal from Ron Vlaar gave United a 2–3 victory at Villa Park. The spirited performance the players showed in the last game (despite the loss) was soon forgotten as Villa were taught a lesson in their next match against the champions Manchester City at the Etihad Stadium. City thrashed Villa 5–0 with braces each for Sergio Agüero and Carlos Tevez, which included a highly controversial penalty and a goal from David Silva. The result meant they dropped down into the relegation places. On 22 November, Alan Hutton joined Nottingham Forest on an emergency loan until 1 January. The right-back had not made a single appearance this season and had been banished from first team training, having been made to train with the reserve squad all season. The club ended a trio of matches against former Premier League champions with a home tie against Arsenal. The match was a stalemate finishing 0–0, with Villa earning a valuable point to go a point ahead of fellow strugglers Reading, before their vital relegation scrap three days later (27 November). The month finished the way it started for Villa as they grabbed a much needed win, as well as a clean sheet, against Reading. The match ended 1–0 courtesy of a late Christian Benteke header. This result, coupled with Southampton's draw with Norwich, meant Villa entered December outside of the relegation places.

November league table

November game stats

December

Month summary
December started with an away match against a winless Queens Park Rangers team, rooted to the bottom of the table. Brett Holman gave Villa the lead within the first ten minutes with his first goal for the club. Jamie Mackie equalised for Rangers ten minutes later and the score stayed that way until the end, finishing 1–1. The draw for the third round of the FA Cup was made the next day (2 December), with Villa getting a home tie against Championship side Ipswich Town. The match was to be played on 5 January 2013. Another draw followed the QPR game, as Villa drew 0–0 versus clean sheet specialists Stoke City at Villa Park. Darren Bent made his return for Villa, coming on as a substitute, having not played since 30 October. Villa's next match came in the form of a League Cup quarter-final against Paul Lambert's former club Norwich City. Much was made of Lambert's first return to Carrow Road, made even more intense by the reported lawsuits being filed between both parties. The Villa team made it a very happy return for Lambert, running out 1–4 winners against the Canaries. Andreas Weimann grabbed his second brace of the season and goals from Brett Holman and Christian Benteke booked Villa's place in the semi-finals for the second time in four seasons. This result filled the young Villa team with massive confidence going into their next game against Liverpool at Anfield, where they gained only their second away win of the season with a 1–3 success. A brace from Christian Benteke and a third from Andreas Weimann meant Villa had led 0–3 before Steven Gerrard scored a late consolation for the Reds. The result extended Villa's unbeaten run to six games in all competitions and lifted them up to 14th in the Premier League, their highest position since 22 September. The draw for the semi-finals of the League cup was made on 19 December, eight days after Villa had booked their place, following the Leeds United/Chelsea quarter-final. Villa will play Bradford City over two legs, the first being played away at Valley Parade on 8 January 2013, with the second at Villa Park on 22 January 2013. Villa's unbeaten run came to a shuddering halt in the last game before Christmas as the team went down 8–0 to Chelsea at Stamford Bridge, their heaviest ever defeat in the Premier League. Villa's Christmas misery continued into the next game after they were beaten 0–4 by Tottenham Hotspur. The first goal was scored by Jermain Defoe, before Gareth Bale got his first Premier League hat-trick to seal a convincing win for Spurs. Villa's festive period nightmare continued further as they lost their third game in a row against fellow strugglers Wigan Athletic, 0–3. An early goal from defender Iván Ramis and second half goals from Emerson Boyce and Arouna Koné sent Wigan above Villa in the table. Villa finished the 2012 calendar year in 17th place, only one point off the relegation places but with a much inferior goal difference than their rivals after conceding 15 goals in the three festive period games.

December league table

December game stats

January

Month summary
Villa began 2013 with a 2–2 draw against Swansea City at the Liberty Stadium. Wayne Routledge gave the Swans an early lead, before an Andreas Weimann strike on the stroke of half-time brought Villa level. Villa looked to have snatched a vital win, when they earned an 84th-minute penalty (their first in almost a year) which was converted by Christian Benteke. However, a stoppage time equalizer from Danny Graham made sure the points were shared. The club gained their first win of the new year, as they beat Ipswich Town 2–1 in the FA Cup on 5 January. Villa had to come from behind however, as Michael Chopra's deflected shot gave Ipswich a half time lead. Darren Bent equalized immediately after the break with a goal against his former club and Andreas Weimann booked Villa's place in the fourth round with an 83rd-minute winner. Villa were then drawn to face Millwall at The Den in the fourth round of the FA Cup to be played on 25 January. The first leg of the League Cup semi-final against Bradford City was next for Villa three days later. The match did not go the way Villa would have thought, wanted or hoped for though as they lost 1–3 to the Bantams at Valley Parade. Bradford took the lead early in the first half as Nahki Wells beat the offside trap to finish neatly past Shay Given after a deflected shot. Matt Duke made a series of inspired saves throughout both halves keeping Villa at bay, before Rory McArdle put Bradford 2–0 up in the 77th minute. Villa pulled a goal back five minutes later through Andreas Weimann, but Bradford regained their two-goal advantage when Carl McHugh fired a header past Given to give Bradford a shock victory and leave Villa with all the work to do in the second leg to reach the final. Villa's League Cup hangover continued as they were beaten 0–1 by fellow strugglers Southampton in a must win six-pointer. Rickie Lambert converted a highly controversial penalty won by Jay Rodriguez, who looked to have gone done with no contact under the challenge of Enda Stevens. This result meant Southampton leapfrogged Villa, who dropped back into the relegation places for the first time since November. The team then competed in a local derby against West Bromwich Albion, where they threw away a two-goal lead to draw 2–2. Christian Benteke and Gabriel Agbonlahor gave Villa a half time lead but Chris Brunt pulled a goal back immediately after the break for the Baggies. They continued to attack, controlling the game, and eventually Peter Odemwingie equalized meaning the points were shared. Villa's misery then continued, as the team was knocked out of the League Cup by fourth-tier Bradford City. After losing 1–3 in the first leg, Villa had to win by two clear goals to take the tie to extra-time. However, they could only manage a 2–1 victory (3–4 on aggregate) and exited the competition as a result. Yet more gloom and doom followed as the team were knocked out of a second cup in four days. after losing 1–2 against Millwall in the FA Cup. Darren Bent gave Villa the lead but Danny Shittu equalized five minutes later for the hosts, with Villa conceding from yet another corner. Just as a replay looked on the cards, John Marquis grabbed the winner for the Championship outfit, to send them through and pile even more pressure onto the extremely fragile Villa team and manager Paul Lambert. Villa's awful January was compounded in their last game of the month, against Newcastle United. Newcastle raced into a 2–0 half time lead after goals from Papiss Cissé and Yohan Cabaye but Christian Benteke pulled a goal back for Villa early in the second half from the penalty spot. However, it was not enough as the Toon held on for the win, despite a major Villa fightback. This result was Villa's fourth home defeat in a row.

Deadline day saw Villa make their only transfers of the January transfer window, as they signed defensive midfielder Yacouba Sylla from Ligue 2 side Clermont Foot as well as Simon Dawkins on loan from Tottenham Hotspur. Both players continued Paul Lambert's system of buying inexperienced, cheap players as opposed to the experienced players Villa desperately required. Lambert later stated that he just did not have the money to buy big names, pay high wages and compete with their rivals, with some sources stating the kitty to be as low as£3 million.

Stephen Warnock left Villa to join Leeds United, having not made an appearance all season, after three years at the club. Alan Hutton had also left, as he joined Spanish side Mallorca on 29 January on loan until the end of the season.

January league table

January game stats

February

Month summary
February started with a mixed result for Villa as they drew 3–3 with high-flying Everton. On one hand, Villa picked up a vital and unexpected point however they had led 3–1 at one point, after goals from Christian Benteke (2) and Gabriel Agbonlahor. They then conceded another goal and a stoppage time equaliser as Marouane Fellaini made sure the points were shared. This result kept Villa second from bottom in the Premier League. Villa finally ended their eight-game winless run, as well as four home defeats in a row with a 2–1 victory over West Ham United at Villa Park. A lackluster first half saw few chances for either side, with the only one of note seeing Andreas Weimann shoot wide from six yards after Jussi Jääskeläinen had spilled a Christian Benteke shot. Benteke then scored a penalty to give Villa a 74th-minute lead, before Charles N'Zogbia, who had himself won the penalty, scored a sublime free kick four minutes later. An Ashley Westwood own goal made for a nervy last few minutes but Villa held on for a precious three points, to move out of the relegation zone. Despite the brilliant win against West Ham, Villa lost their last game of the month against Arsenal 2–1 after a late winner from Santi Cazorla, leaving them in 18th place at the end of February.

February league table

February game stats

March

Month summary
Villa started March as they had ended February with defeat by one of the higher ranking sides, losing 0–1 to Manchester City at Villa Park. A Ciaran Clark slip in his own half eventually led to Carlos Tevez grabbing the winner for City. However, Villa then won back to back matches in the Premier League for the first time since May 2011, after beating two major relegation rivals in Reading and Queens Park Rangers. The Reading game marked the first time in the season that Villa had come from behind to win, eventually winning 1–2. They then managed to achieve this feat again when they defeated QPR who had led 0–1. The match eventually finished 3–2 to Villa, temporarily putting a six-point gap between themselves and the relegation zone. The next match, however, saw Villa's mini revival come to an end as they were defeated 1–2 by Liverpool at Villa Park, seeing them again slip into the relegation zone on goal difference.

March league table

March game stats

April

Month summary
Villa started April perfectly, with a 1–3 away victory over Stoke City at the Britannia Stadium. Gabriel Agbonlahor gave Villa an early lead that lasted until the 80th minute when Michael Kightly equalised for Stoke. However, a spectacular volley from Matthew Lowton put Villa back in front with less than five minutes to go. From 30 yards out, Lowton chested down a clearance from a corner and sweetly struck the ball past goalkeeper Asmir Begović. Christian Benteke then skipped through the Stoke defence and slid the ball into the back of the net to wrap up the points for Villa, as well as the third win in their last four games. Villa drew 1–1 in their next game against Fulham, with Charles N'Zogbia giving Villa the lead but a Fabian Delph own goal meant the points were shared. Villa then faced Manchester United, with United being crowned champions if they won. They did so, 3–0, after Robin van Persie scored a hat-trick within the first 33 minutes of the game. Villa's final game of the month saw them thrash Sunderland 6–1 at Villa Park, giving them their best result of the season and of Paul Lambert's reign. The result was also Villa's biggest home win in 17 years and the first time they had scored six in a match since the 2007–08 season. Christian Benteke scored his first hat-trick for Villa, becoming the first player to do so in five years, which meant he both exceeded Dwight Yorke's record of 17 Premier League goals in a season and became the first Villa player to reach 20 goals in a season in nine years. Gabriel Agbonlahor also scored, making him Villa's highest Premier League goalscorer with 61 goals. Captain Ron Vlaar, with his first goal for the club, and Andreas Weimann wrapped up a memorable night for Villa as they went five points clear of the drop zone and above Newcastle United on goal difference, after an 11-goal swing.

April league table

April game stats

May
The first game of the month saw Villa continue their good form by beating Norwich City 1–2 at Carrow Road to send them up to 13th in the table as well as to the 40-point mark.Gabriel Agbonlahor scored both of Villa's goals, including the 89th-minute winner, either side of a Grant Holt penalty. On 9 May, club captain Stiliyan Petrov announced his retirement from football after battling acute leukaemia for over a year. Villa added Petrov to the club's hall of fame, an honour only 12 other players have received. Villa lost their last home game of the season 1–2 against Chelsea. Both teams had a man sent off, Ramires for Chelsea and Villa's goalscorer Christian Benteke. Frank Lampard became Chelsea all-time top scorer as he scored both of their goals. Villa's final game of the season came against Wigan Athletic. Wigan had been relegated mid-week after defeat by Arsenal which confirmed Villa's safety. The match itself finished 2–2, with Villa's goals coming from Darren Bent and Ron Vlaar in either half. Villa finished the season in 15th place, five points clear of relegation.

May league table

May game stats

Key events

 12 March 2012: Australian Brett Holman agrees to join Villa on a free transfer, when his contract expires with AZ.
14 May: Alex McLeish is sacked as manager, after a poor season in charge.
23 May: The club announces that they will be releasing 11 players, including three first-team players: Carlos Cuéllar, Emile Heskey and Brad Guzan.
2 June: Villa appoint Paul Lambert as their new manager, on a three-year deal.
9 June: Reserve team coach Kevin MacDonald leaves the club after 17 years.
1 July: Brett Holman officially joins Aston Villa.
2 July: Karim El Ahmadi signs from Feyenoord for an undisclosed fee, believed to be £2 million.
5 July: Ian Culverhouse and Gary Karsa join the backroom staff as Assistant Manager and Head of Football Operation respectively.
6 July: Matthew Lowton completes a move from Sheffield United for an undisclosed fee, believed to be £3 million.
16 July: Brad Guzan signs a new three-year contract to re-sign for Villa, after his release in May.
1 August: Central defender James Collins departs to West Ham United for £2.5 million, while his replacement Ron Vlaar joins the club for £3.2 million.
15 August: Villa draw Tranmere Rovers, of League One, in the second round of the League Cup.
18 August: Villa lose 1–0 in their opening fixture of the new season, against newly promoted West Ham United. Darren Bent is appointed captain for the match, and is likely to remain so for the season whilst Stiliyan Petrov recovers from leukaemia.
24 August: Cameroonian Jean Makoun leaves on loan for a second season running, this time joining Rennes until the end of the season. Meanwhile, young midfielder Gary Gardner is ruled out for the rest of the season after suffering an anterior cruciate ligament injury – the second of his career.
28 August: Villa make it through to the third round of the League Cup, after a 3–0 win against Tranmere Rovers.
29 August: England under-21 left back Joe Bennett joins from Middlesbrough, with the fee rumoured to be between £2.5 and 4 million.
30 August: Villa draw champions Manchester City in the third round of the League Cup, to be played on 25 September.
31 August: On transfer deadline day, Villa sign strikers Christian Benteke and Jordan Bowery from Genk and League Two side Chesterfield respectively, with Benteke costing Villa £7 million. Bowery signed officially for an undisclosed fee rumoured to be £500,000 rising to £1 million based on appearances. The club also recruited 22-year-old Crewe Alexandra captain Ashley Westwood for an undisclosed fee rumoured to be £2 million. A£7 million bid was accepted for American forward Clint Dempsey by Fulham but the player rejected the move. Nathan Delfouneso leaves on a season-long loan to Blackpool.
2 September: Villa earn their first point of the season, after drawing 1–1 with Newcastle United.
15 September: Villa end a club record 13 game winless streak in the league, as they gain their first win of the season by defeating Swansea City 2–0. Ron Vlaar replaces Darren Bent as captain for the season.
21 September: Out of favour left back, Stephen Warnock, joins Bolton Wanderers on a three-month loan.
25 September: Villa book their place in the fourth round of the League Cup, by knocking out Manchester City after a 2–4 win in extra time.
26 September: The fourth round draw for the League Cup sees Villa pitted against Swindon Town, in an away draw to be played on 30 October.
27 October: Villa's 1–1 draw with Norwich City.
30 October: Villa get through to the League Cup quarter-finals after a tightly fought game against Swindon Town ended in a 3–2 victory.
31 October: Villa draw Norwich City in the League Cup quarter-finals to be played at Carrow Road on 11 December.
2 November: Villa gain their first away win since January, after defeating Sunderland 0–1 at the Stadium of Light.
22 November: Alan Hutton leaves Villa to go on loan to Nottingham Forest until 1 January.
27 November: The vital relegation scrap with Reading ends in a 1–0 win for Villa, pulling them out of the relegation zone.
2 December: Villa are drawn against Ipswich Town in the third round of the FA Cup, to be played on 5 January 2013.
11 December: Villa reach the semi-finals of the League Cup, after a 1–4 victory over Norwich City.
19 December: Villa will face the remaining lowest ranked team, Bradford City, in the League Cup semi-finals over two legs in January 2013.
23 December: Villa suffer their heaviest ever Premier League defeat at the hands of Chelsea, the match finishes 8–0.
29 December: Villa end their annus horribilis of 2012 one point above the relegation zone with a far inferior goal difference after conceding 15 goals in three games, the latest in a 0–3 home defeat by Wigan Athletic.
5 January 2013: Villa are through to the fourth round of the FA Cup after beating Ipswich Town 2–1.
6 January: Villa will face Millwall away in the fourth round of the FA Cup on 25 January.
8 January: Villa suffer a shock defeat in their League Cup semi-final first leg against Bradford City, losing 3–1.
22 January: Villa are knocked out of the League Cup, after losing 3–4 on aggregate to Bradford City.
25 January: Villa exit a second cup competition in four days, as they are beaten 2–1 by Championship side Millwall.
29 January: Villa end a disastrous month with which has seen them knocked out of both cup competitions and enter the relegation zone yet again, with a 1–2 defeat by Newcastle United at Villa Park. Alan Hutton is loaned out to Mallorca until the end of the season.
31 January: Villa complete the signing of Yacouba Sylla from Clermont Foot and loan Simon Dawkins from Tottenham Hotspur until the end of the season. Stephen Warnock departs to Leeds United.
10 February: Villa end an eight-game winless run, as well as both climbing out of the relegation zone and preventing their worst home run in 50 years (five defeats in a row), with a 2–1 victory over West Ham United.
16 March: Villa record their first back-to-back wins since May 2011 as they beat relegation rivals Queens Park Rangers 3–2, having beaten Reading 1–2 at the Madejski Stadium the previous week.
6 April: Villa record their third win in four games after beating Stoke City 1–3, which included a Goal of the Season contender from Matthew Lowton. The result lifts Villa to 16th place, two points above the relegation zone.
29 April: Villa record their best result of the season after thrashing Sunderland 6–1. Christian Benteke scores his first hat-trick for the club and also reaches the 20 goal mark in the process.
4 May: Villa reach 40 points after a 1–2 victory over Norwich City.
9 May: Club captain Stiliyan Petrov announces his retirement from football after his battle with acute leukaemia.
14 May: Villa's safety is confirmed as Wigan Athletic are relegated after a 4–1 defeat by Arsenal.
19 May: Villa end the season with a 2–2 away draw against Wigan Athletic at the DW Stadium. The result means Villa finish in 15th place in the Premier League.

Players

Squad information

In the 2010–11 season the Premier League introduced new rules on squad lists. The rules included a cap on the number of players at 25; players under the age of 21 on 1 January of the year in which the season starts are exempt from the list of 25. A "home-grown rule" also requires clubs to name at least eight players in their squad of 25 players that have been registered domestically for a minimum of three seasons prior to their 21st birthday.

Players under 21 do not need to be named and can still be used.
Squad subject to change during summer transfer window.

First team squad
Last updated on 19 May 2013

 1 Guzan was originally signed in 2008 but then released in May 2012, before being re-signed in July 2012 on a new three-year contract.
 2 Petrov was Aston Villa's club captain, but Vlaar was appointed "team captain" for the season, as Petrov was in remission from leukaemia. Darren Bent was originally named team captain, but Vlaar replaced him from 15 September

Reserve squad
Players listed in bold are also part of the first team squad, as listed on the club's official website.

Squad numbers
Dutchman Ron Vlaar takes over the vacant number 4 after his move from Feyenoord and Ciaran Clark receives the number 6 after James Collins' departure to West Ham. New striker Jordan Bowery takes over Clark's number 21, while new signing Karim El Ahmadi receives the number 8 shirt for this season, last worn by Jermaine Jenas after his short loan spell at Villa last season. Fellow new recruits Brett Holman and Matthew Lowton have been handed the number 14 and 34 shirts respectively. The former occupier of number 14, Nathan Delfouneso, now takes the number 23 shirt as a result of Holman's arrival. Brad Guzan retains the number 22 after being re-signed by Paul Lambert, having previously been released in May 2012.

Deadline day signings Ashley Westwood and Christian Benteke will wear number 15 and 20 respectively, whilst Joe Bennett acquires the number 27.

Young goalkeeper Benjamin Siegrist has been promoted to the first team for this season and has been handed number 39.

Transfers

In

Summer

Winter

Total spending:  £22 million +

Out

Summer

Winter

Total income:  £2.5 million

Loans

In

Winter

Out

Summer

Winter

Club

Kit

Sponsorship
In February 2012, it was announced that Aston Villa will have a new kit sponsor for this season, ending the existing deal with Nike that has been running since 2007. Italian sportswear manufacturer Macron will produce the club's playing and training kits from 2012 to 2013. Villa will become Macron's flagship club in the United Kingdom, and the deal will see the latter producing a full fashion range alongside kit commitments for the managerial and playing staff.

Villa's club sponsorship deal with Malaysian-based group Genting Casinos will also continue.

Managerial changes
The club have appointed a new manager for this season (the third in a row) after Alex McLeish was sacked on 14 May 2012. McLeish only lasted eleven months in charge after replacing Gérard Houllier in June 2011.

He was replaced by fellow Scot Paul Lambert on 2 June, who was signed from Norwich City. Lambert remained as Aston Villa manager for the entire season.

Season statistics

Appearances
{| class="wikitable" style="font-size: 100%; text-align: center;"
|-
|rowspan="2" |Number
|rowspan="2" |Nation
|rowspan="2" ; width=95% |Name
|colspan="2" |Premier League
|colspan="2" |FA Cup
|colspan="2" |League Cup
|colspan="2" |Total
|colspan="1" |Notes
|-
!width=60 |Start
!width=60 |Sub
!width=60 |Start
!width=60 |Sub
!width=60 |Start
!width=60 |Sub
!width=60 |Start
!width=60 |Sub
!width=120|
|-
!colspan=12 |Goalkeepers
|-
|1 || ||Given|| 2 || – || 2 || – || 5 || – || 9 || 0 ||
|-
|22 || ||Guzan|| 36 || – || – || – || 1 || – || 37 || 0 ||
|-
|33 || ||Marshall|| – || – || – || – || – || – || 0 || 0 ||
|-
|39 || ||Siegrist|| – || – || – || – || – || – || 0 || 0 ||
|-
!colspan=12 |Defenders
|-
|2 || ||Hutton|| – || – || – || – || – || – || 0 || 0 ||
|-
|3 || ||Warnock|| – || – || – || – || – || – || 0 || 0 ||
|-
|4 || ||Vlaar|| 26|| – || 1 || – || 3 || – || 30 || 0 ||
|-
|5 || ||Dunne|| – || – || – || – || – || – || 0 || 0 ||
|-
|6 || ||Clark|| 30 || – || 2 || – || 3 || – || 35 || 0 ||
|-
|27 || ||Bennett|| 21 || 4 || 2 || – || 2 || – || 25 || 4 ||
|-
|29 || ||Stevens|| 6 || 1 || – || – || 1 || 1 || 7 || 2 ||
|-
|30 || ||Lichaj|| 9 || 8 || 2 || – || 3 || 1 || 14 || 9 ||
|-
|32 || ||Baker|| 25 || 1 || 1 || – || 2 || – || 28 || 1 ||
|-
|34 || ||Lowton|| 37 || – || 1 || – || 5 || – || 43 || 0 ||
|-
|37 || ||Williams|| – || 1 || – || – || – || – || 0 || 1 ||
|-
!colspan=12 |Midfielders
|-
|7 || ||Ireland|| 9 || 4 || – || 1 || 3 || – || 12 || 5 ||
|-
|8 || ||El Ahmadi|| 13 || 6 || – || – || 3 || – || 15 || 7 ||
|-
|10 || ||N'Zogbia|| 10 || 10 || 2 || – || 3 || 2 || 15 || 12 ||
|-
|12 || ||Albrighton|| 4 || 5 || 1 || – || – || 1 || 5 || 6 ||
|-
|14 || ||Holman|| 16 || 11 || – || – || 1 || 1 || 17 || 12 ||
|-
|15 || ||Westwood|| 27 || 2 || 1 || – || – || – || 28 || 2 ||
|-
|16 || ||Delph|| 19 || 4 || 2 || – || 4 || 1 || 25 || 5 ||
|-
|17 || ||Makoun|| – || – || – || – || – || – || 0 || 0 ||
|-
|18 || ||Sylla|| 8 || 3 || – || – || – || – || 8 || 3 ||
|-
|19 || ||Petrov|| – || – || – || – || – || – || 0 || 0 ||
|-
|25 || ||Bannan|| 20 || 5 || 1 || 1 || 3 || – || 24 || 6 ||
|-
|31 || ||Herd|| 9 || – || – || – || 3 || 1 || 12 || 1 ||
|-
|35 || ||Johnson|| – || – || – || – || – || – || 0 || 0 ||
|-
|38 || ||Gardner|| – || 2 || – || – || – || – || 0 || 2 ||
|-
|40 || ||Carruthers|| – || – || – || – || – || – || 0 || 0 ||
|-
!colspan=12 |Forwards
|-
|9 || ||Bent|| 8 || 8 || 2 || – || 2 || 2 || 12 || 10 ||
|-
|11 || ||Agbonlahor|| 23 || 4 || – || 1 || 3 || – || 27 || 5 ||
|-
|20 || ||Benteke|| 34 || 2 || – || – || 5 || – || 39 || 2 ||
|-
|21 || ||Bowery|| 3 || 7 || 1 || 1 || – || – || 4 || 8 ||
|-
|23 || ||Delfouneso|| 1 || – || – || – || – || – || 1 || 0 ||
|-
|24 || ||Dawkins|| – || 4 || – || – || – || – || 0 || 4 ||
|-
|26 || ||Weimann|| 25 || 4 || 1 || 1 || 4 || 2 || 30 || 7 ||
|-
|36 || ||Burke|| – || – || – || – || – || 2 || 0 || 2 ||

Players listed are those who have most appearances in respected positions.
Includes Cup competitions as well (League Cup & FA Cup).
Notes

Captains

1 Bent was originally named as Stiliyan Petrov's successor for the season but Vlaar replaced him from 15 September 2012.

Goalscorers

Correct as of 19 May 2013
Players with the same number of goals are listed by their position on the club's official website Source
  Players highlighted in light grey denote the player had scored for the club before leaving for another club
  Players highlighted in light cyan denote the player has scored for the club after arriving at Aston Villa during the season
  Players highlighted in Blonde denote the player has scored for the club before leaving the club on loan for part/the rest of the season

Clean sheets

Includes all competitive matches.

Disciplinary record

Correct as of 19 May 2013
Players with the same number of cards are listed by their position on the club's official website Source
  Players highlighted in light grey denote the player has received a yellow/red card for the club before leaving for another club
  Players highlighted in light cyan denote the player has received a yellow/red card for the club after arriving at Aston Villa during the season
  Players highlighted in Blonde denote the player has received a yellow/red card for the club before leaving the club on loan for part/the rest of the season
One  = Two 

Notes
1El Ahmadi received his fifth yellow card of the season against Swindon Town on 30 October 2012. This was not documented on the BBC match report, though the suspension was served.

Home attendances

Correct as of 11 May 2013

Competitions

Overall

Pre season

US tour
On 27 March 2012, the club announced plans for a pre-season tour of the US as part of the preparations for the 2012–13 season. The tour saw the club taking on Major League Soccer clubs from the three US cities of Portland, Chicago and Philadelphia between 18 and 24 July 2012.

Villa won all three matches, after 1–0 victories over both Philadelphia Union and Chicago Fire and a penalty shootout victory after an initial 2–2 draw with Portland Timbers.

Premier League

League table

Results summary

Results by matchday

Matches

FA Cup

League Cup

Notes

References

Aston Villa
Aston Villa F.C. seasons